The 2014-2015 Champion Tillsonburg Thunder are a Senior ice hockey team based in Tillsonburg, Ontario, Canada. They play in the Western Ontario Super Hockey League.

History
The Tillsonburg Vipers were founded in 2001 as a Senior "AAA" team in the Ontario Hockey Association's Major League Hockey.

In the 2003–04 season, the Vipers reached the J. Ross Robertson Cup finals, but lost to the Aylmer Blues 4-games-to-2.

Tillsonburg's improved on their 2003-04 record in the 2005-06 season.  After finishing the regular season in second place with 17 wins in 30 games, the Vipers knocked off the Cambridge Hornets 4-games-to-3 to make the league finals.  In the league final, the Vipers fell to the Dundas Real McCoys 4-games-to-3.

The MLH fell apart in 2008, just after the Brantford Blast won the league's first ever Allan Cup.  The team filled the gap when the disgruntled Cambridge Hornets left the MLH, the collegiate Windsor St. Clair Saints, walked away from the league.  The Vipers decided it was their time to leave as well and applied to join the Western Ontario Athletic Association Senior Hockey League.  The WOAA is an independent league with no connections to the Ontario Hockey Association.  It classifies itself as Senior "AA", and allows for both a Senior "AA" and Senior "A" championship come playoff time.  On May 14, 2008, the WOAA granted expansion to the Tillsonburg Vipers.

The first ever Tillsonburg WOAA game took place on October 4, 2008, as the Thunder defeated the Goderich Pirates 6-5 in overtime in Tillsonburg.  The Thunder had a successful first season in the WOAA, earning a record of 11-7-2, registering 24 points, and fifth place in the South Division.  Tillsonburg would lose to the Clinton Radars in the "AA" qualifying round, being sent to the "A" playoffs.  In the "A" quarter-finals, the Thunder were upset by the Exeter Mohawks in six games, ending their season.

Season-by-season standings

References

External links
Tillsonburg Thunder

Ice hockey teams in Ontario
Senior ice hockey teams
Tillsonburg